= List of schools in Fukushima =

This is a list of schools in Fukushima.

== Senior high schools ==
Senior high schools in Fukushima are operated by both Fukushima Prefecture and private companies.

Prefectural senior high schools

English	Japanese	Rōmaji	Location
Fukushima Prefecture Fukushima High School	福島県立福島高等学校	Fukushima-kenritsu Fukushima Kōtō Gakkō	37.76504°N 140.46077°E
Fukushima Prefecture Fukushima Tachibana High School	福島県立橘高等学校	Fukushima-kenritsu Tachibana Kōtō Gakkō	37.76257°N 140.4673°E
Fukushima Prefecture Fukushima Commercial High School	福島県立福島商業高等学校	Fukushima-kenritsu Fukushima Shōgyō Kōtō Gakkō	37.7845°N 140.4763°E
Fukushima Prefecture Fukushima Meisei High School	福島県立福島明成高等学校	Fukushima-kenritsu Fukushima Meisei Kōtō Gakkō	37.72308°N 140.4499°E
Fukushima Prefecture Fukushima Technical High School	福島県立福島工業高等学校	Fukushima-kenritsu Fukushima Kōgyō Kōtō Gakkō	37.76910°N 140.45209°E
Fukushima Prefecture Fukushima Nishi High School	福島県立福島西高等学校	Fukushima-kenritsu Fukushima Nishi Kōtō Gakkō	37.74839°N 140.45037°E
Fukushima Prefecture Fukushima Kita High School	福島県立福島北高等学校	Fukushima-kenritsu Fukushima Kita Kōtō Gakkō	37.81690°N 140.45115°E
Fukushima Prefecture Fukushima Higashi High School	福島県立福島東高等学校	Fukushima-kenritsu Fukushima Higashi Kōtō Gakkō	37.75760°N 140.47644°E
Fukushima Prefecture Fukushima Minami High School	福島県立福島南高等学校	Fukushima-kenritsu Fukushima Minami Kōtō Gakkō	37.74796°N 140.47473°E
Fukushima Prefecture Fukushima Chūō High School	福島県立福島中央高等学校	Fukushima-kenritsu Fukushima Chūō Kōtō Gakkō	37.74796°N 140.47473°E

Private senior high schools (5)

English	Japanese	Rōmaji	Location
Shōin Academy Fukushima High School	松韻学園福島高等学校	Shōin Gakuen Fukushima Kōtō Gakkō	37.76495°N 140.46825°E
Fukushima Seikei High School	福島成蹊高等学校	Fukushima Seikei Kōtō Gakkō	37.75617°N 140.47718°E
Fukushima Tōryō High School	福島東稜高等学校	Fukushima Tōryō Kōtō Gakkō	37.76904°N 140.47460°E
Sakura no Seibo High School	桜の聖母学院高等学校	Sakura no Seibo Gakuin Kōtō Gakkō	37.76064°N 140.44443°E

== Junior high schools ==
Most junior high schools within the city are operated by the Fukushima City Board of Education, however two junior high schools are privately operated, and one, Fukushima University Attached Junior High School, is a national school run by Fukushima University.

National junior high schools (1)

English	Japanese	Rōmaji	Location
Fukushima University Attached Junior High School	福島大学附属中学校	Fukushima Daigaku Fuzoku Chūgakkō	37.75908°N 140.47710°E

City junior high schools (21)

English	Japanese	Rōmaji	Location
Fukushima First Junior High School	福島第一中学校	Fukushima Daiichi Chūgakkō	37.74134°N 140.46385°E
Fukushima Second Junior High School	福島第二中学校	Fukushima Daini Chūgakkō	37.76189°N 140.47838°E
Fukushima Third Junior High School	福島第三中学校	Fukushima Daisan Chūgakkō	37.77648°N 140.49082°E
Fukushima Fourth Junior High School	福島第四中学校	Fukushima Daiyon Chūgakkō	37.76645°N 140.46239°E
Gakuyō Junior High School	岳陽中学校	Gakuyō Chūgakkō	37.75124°N 140.45417°E
Watari Junior High School	渡利中学校	Watari Chūgakkō	37.74535°N 140.47868°E
Shinryō Junior High School	信陵中学校	Shinryō Chūgakkō	37.78948°N 140.43226°E
Hokushin Junior High School	北信中学校	Hokushin Chūgakkō	37.79873°N 140.47983°E
Tatsukoyama Junior High School	立子山中学校	Tatsukoyama Chūgakkō	37.68081°N 140.51758°E
Seishin Junior High School	西信中学校	Seishin Chūgakkō	37.72741°N 140.38539°E
Ōtori Junior High School	大鳥中学校	Ōtori Chūgakkō	37.83174°N 140.44535°E
Hirano Junior High School	平野中学校	Hirano Chūgakkō	37.80395°N 140.43816°E
Nishine Junior High School	西根中学校	Nishine Chūgakkō	37.83309°N 140.46632°E
Moniwa Junior High School	茂庭中学校	Moniwa Chūgakkō	37.92031°N 140.42456°E
Shōryō Junior High School	松陵中学校	Shōryō Chūgakkō	37.65659°N 140.46145°E
Shinobu Junior High School	信夫中学校	Shinobu Chūgakkō	37.72337°N 140.43572°E
Hōrai Junior High School	蓬萊中学校	Hōrai Chūgakkō	37.69591°N 140.47934°E
Azuma Junior High School	吾妻中学校	Azuma Chūgakkō	37.76447°N 140.37752°E
Noda Junior High School	野田中学校	Noda Chūgakkō	37.76069°N 140.42128°E
Shimizu Junior High School	清水中学校	Shimizu Chūgakkō	37.77269°N 140.43602°E
Iino Junior High School	飯野中学校	Iino Chūgakkō	37.65881°N 140.5316°E

Private junior high schools (2)

English	Japanese	Rōmaji	Location
Sakura no Seibo Junior High School	桜の聖母学院中学校	Sakura no Seibo Gakuin Chūgakkō	37.76052°N 140.44445°E
Fukushima Seikei Junior High School	福島成蹊中学校	Fukushima Seikei Chūgakkō	37.75698°N 140.48183°E

== Elementary schools ==
The Fukushima City Board of Education operates the majority of elementary schools in the city. However, Fukushima University operates a single national elementary school while Sakura no Seibo operates a private elementary school.

National elementary schools (1)

English	Japanese	Rōmaji	Location
Fukushima University Attached Elementary School	福島大学附属小学校	Fukushima Daigaku Fuzoku Shōgakkō	37.76122°N 140.46905°E

City elementary schools (51)

English	Japanese	Rōmaji	Location
Fukushima First Elementary School	福島第一小学校	Fukushima Daiichi Shōgakkō	37.75200°N 140.46658°E
Fukushima Second Elementary School	福島第二小学校	Fukushima Daini Shōgakkō	37.75909°N 140.47314°E
Fukushima Third Elementary School	福島第三小学校	Fukushima Daisan Shōgakkō	37.76681°N 140.47761°E
Fukushima Fourth Elementary School	福島第四小学校	Fukushima Daiyon Shōgakkō	37.75993°N 140.46342°E
Seimei Elementary School	清明小学校	Seimei Shōgakkō	37.74617°N 140.46244°E
Mikawadai Elementary School	三河台小学校	Mikawadai Shōgakkō	37.75772°N 140.45405°E
Moriai Elementary School	森合小学校	Moriai Shōgakkō	37.76759°N 140.44900°E
Suginome Elementary School	杉妻小学校	Suginome Shōgakkō	37.72402°N 140.4637°E
Watari Elementary School	渡利小学校	Watari Shōgakkō	37.75021°N 140.47847°E
Okayama Elementary School	岡山小学校	Okayama Shōgakkō	37.77187°N 140.51059°E
Senoue Elementary School	瀬上小学校	Senoue Shōgakkō	37.80475°N 140.49017°E
Kamata Elementary School	鎌田小学校	Kamata Shōgakkō	37.78821°N 140.48352°E
Tsukinowa Elementary School	月輪小学校	Tsukinowa Shōgakkō	37.79078°N 140.50973°E
Shimizu Elementary School	清水小学校	Shimizu Shōgakkō	37.78006°N 140.44306°E
Amarume Elementary School	余目小学校	Amarume Shōgakkō	37.80639°N 140.47323°E
Yanome Elementary School	矢野目小学校	Yanome Shōgakkō	37.79066°N 140.46394°E
Ōzasō Elementary School	大笹生小学校	Ōzasō Shōgakkō	37.79912°N 140.40272°E
Sasaya Elementary School	笹谷小学校	Sasaya Shōgakkō	37.79563°N 140.42411°E
Arai Elementary School	荒井小学校	Arai Shōgakkō	37.72458°N 140.38786°E
Tsuchiyu Elementary School	土湯小学校	Tsuchiyu Shōgakkō	37.68112°N 140.32949°E
Yoshiida Elementary School	吉井田小学校	Yoshiida Shōgakkō	37.74461°N 140.43240°E
Ōnami Elementary School	大波小学校	Ōnami Shōgakkō	37.75796°N 140.55473°E
Tatsukoyama Elementary School	立子山小学校	Tatsukoyama Shōgakkō	37.68333°N 140.51670°E
Sakura Elementary School	佐倉小学校	Sakura Shōgakkō	37.73280°N 140.39030°E
Sabara Elementary School	佐原小学校	Sabara Shōgakkō	37.72278°N 140.35556°E
Iizaka Elementary School	飯坂小学校	Iizaka Shōgakkō	37.83287°N 140.44721°E
Nakano Elementary School	中野小学校	Nakano Shōgakkō	37.82644°N 140.43128°E
Hirano Elementary School	平野小学校	Hirano Shōgakkō	37.80978°N 140.44264°E
Higashi-yuno Elementary School	東湯野小学校	Higashi-yuno Shōgakkō	37.82286°N 140.47966°E
Yuno Elementary School	湯野小学校	Yuno Shōgakkō	37.83105°N 140.45860°E
Moniwa Elementary School	茂庭小学校	Moniwa Shōgakkō	37.89992°N 140.43173°E
Matsukawa Elementary School	松川小学校	Matsukawa Shōgakkō	37.65616°N 140.46426°E
Mizuhara Elementary School	水原小学校	Mizuhara Shōgakkō	37.66572°N 140.42093°E
Kanayagawa Elementary School	金谷川小学校	Kanayagawa Shōgakkō	37.68341°N 140.46549°E
Ōmori Elementary School	大森小学校	Ōmori Shōgakkō	37.72709°N 140.44188°E
Hirata Elementary School	平田小学校	Hirata Shōgakkō	37.71046°N 140.43096°E
Hiraishi Elementary School	平石小学校	Hiraishi Shōgakkō	37.70072°N 140.44693°E
Torikawa Elementary School	鳥川小学校	Torikawa Shōgakkō	37.73454°N 140.41740°E
Shimokawasaki Elementary School	下川崎小学校	Shimomatsukawa Shōgakkō	37.64468°N 140.50026°E
Hōrai Elementary School	蓬莱小学校	Hōrai Shōgakkō	37.69976°N 140.47246°E
Kita-sawamata Elementary School	北沢又小学校	Kita-sawamata Shōgakkō	37.78596°N 140.43171°E
Niwasaka Elementary School	庭坂小学校	Niwasaka Shōgakkō	37.77280°N 140.38019°E
Niwazuka Elementary School	庭塚小学校	Niwazuka Shōgakkō	37.75761°N 140.37499°E
Noda Elementary School	野田小学校	Noda Shōgakkō	37.77133°N 140.42347°E
Mizuho Elementary School	水保小学校	Mizuhara Shōgakkō	37.74884°N 140.38473°E
Hōrai-higashi Elementary School	蓬莱東小学校	Hōrai-higashi Shōgakkō	37.69296°N 140.48289°E
Oyama Elementary School	御山小学校	Oyama Shōgakkō	37.77862°N 140.45854°E
Nankōdai Elementary School	南向台小学校	Nankodai Shōgakkō	37.72538°N 140.48192°E
Aoki Elementary School	青木小学校	Aoki Shōgakkō	37.67626°N 140.53353°E
Iino Elementary School	飯野小学校	Iino Shōgakkō	37.65709°N 140.52985°E
Ōkubo Elementary School	大久保小学校	Ōkubo Shōgakkō	37.66527°N 140.54779°E

Private elementary schools (1)

English	Japanese	Rōmaji	Location
Sakura no Seibo Elementary School	桜の聖母学院小学校	Sakura no Seibo Gakuin Shōgakkō	37.76224°N 140.47239°E

== Special assistance schools ==
Various special assistance schools for the blind, handicapped, and other general disabilities are operated by Fukushima University, Fukushima Prefecture, and Fukushima City.

National special assistance schools (1)

English	Japanese	Rōmaji	Location
Fukushima University Attached Special Assistance School	福島大学附属特別支援学校	Fukushima Daigaku Fuzoku Tokubetsu Shien Gakkō	37.74727°N 140.44720°E

Prefectural special assistance schools (4)

English	Japanese	Rōmaji	Location
Fukushima Prefecture School for the Blind	福島県立盲学校	Fukushima-kenritsu Mōgakkō	37.76288°N 140.46093°E
Fukushima Prefecture School for the Deaf	福島県立聾学校	Fukushima-kenritsu Rōgakkō	37.76367°N 140.46088°E
Fukushima Prefecture Ōzasō School for the Handicapped	福島県立大笹生養護学校	Fukushima-kenritsu Ōzasō Yōgogakkō	37.81345°N 140.41328°E
Fukushima Medical School Branch of Fukushima Prefecture Sukagawa School for the Handicapped	福島県立須賀川養護学校医大分校	Fukushima-kenritsu Sukagawa Yōgogakkō Idai Bunkō	37.68989°N 140.47136°E

City special assistance schools (1)

English	Japanese	Rōmaji	Location
Fukushima City Fukushima School for the Handicapped	福島市立福島養護学校	Fukushima-shiritsu Yōgogakkō	37.77989°N 140.48079°E
